First Protestant Church is a historic church at 296 South Seguin Street in New Braunfels, Texas.

It was built in 1875 and added to the National Register of Historic Places in 1971.

See also

National Register of Historic Places listings in Comal County, Texas
Recorded Texas Historic Landmarks in Comal County

References

External links

Churches on the National Register of Historic Places in Texas
Gothic Revival church buildings in Texas
Churches completed in 1875
19th-century Protestant churches
Buildings and structures in Comal County, Texas
New Braunfels, Texas
National Register of Historic Places in Comal County, Texas
Recorded Texas Historic Landmarks
19th-century churches in the United States